Margrethe Lynne Winbigler (married Anderson; born March 21, 1953) is an American athlete. She competed in the women's discus throw at the 1976 Summer Olympics.

References

External links
 

1953 births
Living people
Athletes (track and field) at the 1976 Summer Olympics
Athletes (track and field) at the 1979 Pan American Games
American female discus throwers
Olympic track and field athletes of the United States
People from Weiser, Idaho
Sportspeople from Idaho
Pan American Games track and field athletes for the United States
21st-century American women